The 1951 Cleveland Browns season was the team's second season with the National Football League. Dub Jones set an NFL record with six touchdowns in one game versus the Chicago Bears.

Offseason and roster moves 

Cleveland won the NFL championship in 1950, its first year in the league after four seasons in the defunct All-America Football Conference. Head coach Paul Brown made a number of roster moves in the offseason, including bringing in fullback Chick Jagade, end Bob Oristaglio and defensive backs Don Shula and Carl Taseff.

NFL draft selections

Roster and coaching staff

Preseason

Regular season schedule 

Note: Intra-conference opponents are in bold text.

Playoffs

Standings

Awards and records 

 Otto Graham, NFL MVP

References

External links 
 1951 Cleveland Browns at Pro Football Reference
 1951 Cleveland Browns Statistics at jt-sw.com
 1951 Cleveland Browns Schedule at jt-sw.com
 1951 Cleveland Browns at DatabaseFootball.com

Cleveland
Cleveland Browns seasons
Cleveland Browns